= List of largest urban areas by country =

== Largest urban areas, by country ==
Per The World Factbook:

=== Afghanistan ===
4.589 million KABUL (capital) (2023)

=== Albania ===
520,000 TIRANA (capital) (2023)

=== Algeria ===
2.854 million ALGIERS (capital); 922,000 Oran (2022)

=== American Samoa ===
49,000 PAGO PAGO (capital) (2018)

=== Andorra ===
23,000 ANDORRA LA VELLA (capital) (2018)

=== Angola ===
9.292 million LUANDA (capital), 959,000 Lubango, 905,000 Cabinda, 809,000 Benguela, 783,000 Malanje (2023)

=== Anguilla ===
1,000 THE VALLEY (capital) (2018)

=== Antigua and Barbuda ===
21,000 SAINT JOHN'S (capital) (2018)

=== Argentina ===
15.490 million BUENOS AIRES (capital), 1.612 million Cordoba, 1.594 million Rosario, 1.226 million Mendoza, 1.027 million San Miguel de Tucuman, 914,000 La Plata (2023)

=== Armenia ===
1.095 million YEREVAN (capital) (2023)

=== Aruba ===
30,000 ORANJESTAD (capital) (2018)

=== Australia ===
5.235 million Melbourne, 5.121 million Sydney, 2.505 million Brisbane, 2.118 million Perth, 1.367 million Adelaide, 472,000 CANBERRA (capital) (2023)

=== Austria ===
1.975 million VIENNA (capital) (2023)

=== Azerbaijan ===
2.432 million BAKU (capital) (2023)

=== Bahamas, The ===
280,000 NASSAU (capital) (2018)

=== Bahrain ===
689,000 MANAMA (capital) (2022)

=== Bangladesh ===
23.210 million DHAKA (capital), 5.380 million Chittagong, 955,000 Khulna, 962,000 Rajshahi, 969,000 Rangpur, 964,000 Sylhet, 906,000 Bogra (2023)

=== Barbados ===
89,000 BRIDGETOWN (capital) (2018)

=== Belarus ===
2.049 million MINSK (capital) (2022)

=== Belgium ===
2.110 million BRUSSELS (capital); 1.053 million Antwerp (2022)

=== Belize ===
23,000 BELMOPAN (capital) (2018)

=== Benin ===
285,000 PORTO-NOVO (capital) (2018); 1.189 million Abomey-Calavi; 709,000 COTONOU (seat of government) (2022)

=== Bermuda ===
10,000 HAMILTON (capital) (2018)

=== Bhutan ===
203,000 THIMPHU (capital) (2018)

=== Bolivia ===
1.908 million LA PAZ (capital); 1.784 million Santa Cruz; 1.369 million Cochabamba; 278,000 Sucre (constitutional capital) (2022)

=== Bosnia and Herzegovina ===
344,000 SARAJEVO (capital) (2022)

=== Botswana ===
269,000 GABORONE (capital) (2018)

=== Brazil ===
22.620 million Sao Paulo, 13.728 million Rio de Janeiro, 6.248 million Belo Horizonte, 4.873 million BRASILIA (capital), 4.264 million Recife, 4.212 million Porto Alegre (2023)

=== British Virgin Islands ===
15,000 ROAD TOWN (capital) (2018)

=== Brunei ===
241,000 BANDAR SERI BEGAWAN (capital) (2011)

=== Bulgaria ===
1.287 million SOFIA (capital) (2022)

=== Burkina Faso ===
3.056 million OUAGADOUGOU (capital); 1.074 million Bobo-Dioulasso (2022)

=== Burundi ===
1.139 million BUJUMBURA (capital) (2022)

=== Cabo Verde ===
168,000 PRAIA (capital) (2018)

=== Cambodia ===
2.211 million PHNOM PENH (capital) (2022)

=== Cameroon ===
4.164 million YAOUNDE (capital); 3.927 million Douala (2022)

=== Canada ===
6.372 million Toronto, 4.308 million Montreal, 3.05 million Vancouver and the Lower Mainland, 1.640 million Calgary, 1.544 million Edmonton, 1.437 million OTTAWA (capital) (2023)

=== Cayman Islands ===
35,000 GEORGE TOWN (capital) (2018)

=== Central African Republic ===
933,000 BANGUI (capital) (2022)

=== Chad ===
1.533 million N'DJAMENA (capital) (2022)

=== Chile ===
6.903 million SANTIAGO (capital), 1.009 million Valparaiso, 912,000 Concepcion (2023)

=== China ===
29.211 million Shanghai, 21.766 million BEIJING (capital), 17.341 million Chongqing, 14.284 million Guangzhou, 14.239 million Tianjin, 13.073 million Shenzhen (2023)

=== Colombia ===
11.508 million BOGOTA (capital), 4.102 million Medellin, 2.864 million Cali, 2.349 million Barranquilla, 1.381 million Bucaramanga, 1.088 million Cartagena (2023)

=== Comoros ===
62,000 MORONI (capital) (2018)

=== Congo, Democratic Republic of the ===
16.316 million KINSHASA (capital), 2.892 million Mbuji-Mayi, 2.812 million Lubumbashi, 1.664 million Kananga, 1.423 million Kisangani, 1.249 million Bukavu (2023)

=== Congo, Republic of the ===
2.638 million BRAZZAVILLE (capital), 1.336 million Pointe-Noire (2023)

=== Costa Rica ===
1.441 million SAN JOSE (capital) (2022)

=== Côte d'Ivoire ===
231,000 YAMOUSSOUKRO (capital) (2018); 5.516 million ABIDJAN (seat of government) (2022)

=== Croatia ===
684,000 ZAGREB (capital) (2022)

=== Cuba ===
2.149 million HAVANA (capital) (2023)

=== Curacao ===
144,000 WILLEMSTAD (capital) (2018)

=== Cyprus ===
269,000 NICOSIA (capital) (2018)

=== Czech Republic ===
1.318 million PRAGUE (capital) (2022)

=== Denmark ===
1.370 million COPENHAGEN (capital) (2022)

=== Djibouti ===
591,000 DJIBOUTI (capital) (2022)

=== Dominica ===
15,000 ROSEAU (capital) (2018)

=== Dominican Republic ===
3.524 million SANTO DOMINGO (capital) (2023)

=== Ecuador ===
3.142 million Guayaquil, 1.957 million QUITO (capital) (2023)

=== Egypt ===
22.183 million CAIRO (capital), 5.588 million Alexandria, 778,000 Bur Sa'id (2023)

=== El Salvador ===
1.116 million SAN SALVADOR (capital) (2023)

=== Equatorial Guinea ===
297,000 MALABO (capital) (2018)

=== Eritrea ===
1.073 million ASMARA (capital) (2023)

=== Estonia ===
452,000 TALLINN (capital) (2022)

=== Eswatini ===
68,000 MBABANE (capital) (2018)

=== Ethiopia ===
5.461 million ADDIS ABABA (capital) (2023)

=== Falkland Islands ===
2,000 STANLEY (capital) (2018)

=== Faroe Islands ===
21,000 TÓRSHAVN (capital) (2018)

=== Fiji ===
178,000 SUVA (capital) (2018)

=== Finland ===
1.328 million HELSINKI (capital) (2022)

=== France ===
11.208 million PARIS (capital), 1.761 million Lyon, 1.628 million Marseille-Aix-en-Provence, 1.079 million Lille, 1.060 million Toulouse, 1.000 million Bordeaux (2023)

=== French Polynesia ===
136,000 PAPEETE (capital) (2018)

=== Gabon ===
857,000 LIBREVILLE (capital) (2022)

=== Gambia, The ===
470,000 BANJUL (capital) (2022)

=== Georgia ===
1.203 million TBILISI (capital) (2022)

=== Germany ===
3.574 million BERLIN (capital), 1.788 million Hamburg, 1.576 million Munich, 1.144 million Cologne, 796,000 Frankfurt (2023)

=== Ghana ===
3.630 million Kumasi; 2.605 million ACCRA (capital); 1.035 million Sekondi Takoradi (2022)

=== Gibraltar ===
35,000 GIBRALTAR (capital) (2018)

=== Greece ===
3.154 million ATHENS (capital); 814,000 Thessaloniki (2022)

=== Greenland ===
18,000 NUUK (capital) (2018)

=== Grenada ===
39,000 SAINT GEORGE'S (capital) (2018)

=== Guam ===
147,000 HAGATNA (capital) (2018)

=== Guatemala ===
3.095 million GUATEMALA CITY (capital) (2023)

=== Guernsey ===
16,000 SAINT PETER PORT (capital) (2018)

=== Guinea ===
2.049 million CONAKRY (capital) (2022)

=== Guinea-Bissau ===
643,000 BISSAU (capital) (2022)

=== Guyana ===
110,000 GEORGETOWN (capital) (2018)

=== Haiti ===
2.915 million PORT-AU-PRINCE (capital) (2022)

=== Holy See ===
1,000 VATICAN CITY (capital) (2018)

=== Honduras ===
1.568 million TEGUCIGALPA (capital), 982,000 San Pedro Sula (2023)

=== Hong Kong ===
7.643 million Hong Kong (2022)

=== Hungary ===
1.775 million BUDAPEST (capital) (2022)

=== Iceland ===
216,000 REYKJAVÍK (capital) (2018)

=== India ===
32.941 million NEW DELHI (capital), 21.297 million Mumbai, 15.333 million Kolkata, 13.608 million Bangalore, 11.776 million Chennai, 10.801 million Hyderabad (2023)

=== Indonesia ===
11.249 million JAKARTA (capital), 3.729 million Bekasi, 3.044 million Surabaya, 3.041 million Depok, 2.674 million Bandung, 2.514 million Tangerang (2023)

=== Iran ===
9.500 million TEHRAN (capital), 3.368 million Mashhad, 2.258 million Esfahan, 1.721 million Shiraz, 1.661 million Tabriz, 1.594 million Karaj (2023)

=== Iraq ===
7.711 million BAGHDAD (capital), 1.792 million Mosul, 1.448 million Basra, 1.075 million Kirkuk, 958,000 Najaf, 897,000 Erbil (2023)

=== Ireland ===
1.256 million DUBLIN (capital) (2022)

=== Isle of Man ===
27,000 DOUGLAS (capital) (2018)

=== Israel ===
4.344 million Tel Aviv-Yafo; 1.254 million JERUSALEM (capital); 1.164 million Haifa (2022)

=== Italy ===
4.316 million ROME (capital), 3.155 million Milan, 2.179 million Naples, 1.802 million Turin, 913,000 Bergamo, 850,000 Palermo (2023)

=== Jamaica ===
595,000 KINGSTON (capital) (2022)

=== Japan ===
37.194 million TOKYO (capital), 19.013 million Osaka, 9.569 million Nagoya, 5.490 million Kitakyushu-Fukuoka, 2.937 million Shizuoka-Hamamatsu, 2.666 million Sapporo (2023)

=== Jersey ===
34,000 SAINT HELIER (capital) (2018)

=== Jordan ===
2.210 million AMMAN (capital) (2022)

=== Kazakhstan ===
1.987 million Almaty, 1.291 million NUR-SULTAN (capital), 1.155 million Shimkent (2023)

=== Kenya ===
5.325 million NAIROBI (capital), 1.440 million Mombassa (2023)

=== Kiribati ===
64,000 TARAWA (capital) (2018)

=== Korea, North ===
3.158 million PYONGYANG (capital) (2023)

=== Korea, South ===
9.988 million SEOUL (capital), 3.472 million Busan, 2.849 million Incheon, 2.181 million Daegu (Taegu), 1.577 million Daejon (Taejon), 1.529 million Gwangju (Kwangju) (2023)

=== Kosovo ===
216,870 PRISTINA (capital) (2019)

=== Kuwait ===
3.298 million KUWAIT (capital) (2023)

=== Kyrgyzstan ===
1.105 million BISHKEK (capital) (2023)

=== Laos ===
706,000 VIENTIANE (capital) (2022)

=== Latvia ===
625,000 RIGA (capital) (2022)

=== Lebanon ===
2.433 million BEIRUT (capital) (2022)

=== Lesotho ===
350,000 MASERU (capital) (2022)

=== Liberia ===
1.623 million MONROVIA (capital) (2022)

=== Libya ===
1.183 million TRIPOLI (capital), 984,000 Misratah, 859,000 Benghazi (2023)

=== Liechtenstein ===
5,000 VADUZ (capital) (2018)

=== Lithuania ===
541,000 VILNIUS (capital) (2022)

=== Luxembourg ===
120,000 LUXEMBOURG (capital) (2018)

=== Madagascar ===
3.700 million ANTANANARIVO (capital) (2022)

=== Malawi ===
1.222 million LILONGWE (capital); 995,000 Blantyre-Limbe (2022)

=== Malaysia ===
8.622 million KUALA LUMPUR (capital), 1.086 million Johor Bahru, 857,000 Ipoh (2023)

=== Maldives ===
177,000 MALE (capital) (2018)

=== Mali ===
2.817 million BAMAKO (capital) (2022)

=== Malta ===
213,000 VALLETTA (capital) (2018)

=== Marshall Islands ===
31,000 MAJURO (capital) (2018)

=== Mauritania ===
1.432 million NOUAKCHOTT (capital) (2022)

=== Mauritius ===
149,000 PORT LOUIS (capital) (2018)

=== Mexico ===
22.281 million MEXICO CITY (capital), 5.420 million Guadalajara, 5.117 million Monterrey, 3.345 million Puebla, 2.626 million Toluca de Lerdo, 2.260 million Tijuana (2023)

=== Federated States of Micronesia ===
7,000 PALIKIR (capital) (2018)

=== Moldova ===
491,000 CHISINAU (capital) (2022)

=== Monaco ===
39,000 MONACO (capital) (2018)

=== Mongolia ===
1.645 million ULAANBAATAR (capital) (2022)

=== Montenegro ===
177,000 PODGORICA (capital) (2018)

=== Morocco ===
3.893 million Casablanca, 1.959 million RABAT (capital), 1.290 million Fes, 1.314 million Tangier, 1.050 million Marrakech, 979,000 Agadir (2023)

=== Mozambique ===
1.797 million Matola; 1.139 million MAPUTO (capital); 927,000 Nampula (2022)

=== Myanmar (Burma) ===
5.610 million YANGON (capital), 1.532 million Mandalay (2023)

=== Namibia ===
461,000 WINDHOEK (capital) (2022)

=== Nepal ===
1.521 million KATHMANDU (capital) (2022)

=== Netherlands ===
2.48 million AMSTERDAM (capital), 2.40 million Rotterdam – The Hague (2022)

=== New Caledonia ===
198,000 NOUMEA (capital) (2018)

=== New Zealand ===
1.652 million Auckland, 419,000 WELLINGTON (capital) (2022)

=== Nicaragua ===
1.095 million MANAGUA (capital) (2023)

=== Niger ===
1.384 million NIAMEY (capital) (2022)

=== Nigeria ===
15.946 million Lagos, 4.348 million Kano, 3.875 million Ibadan, 3.840 million ABUJA (capital), 3.480 million Port Harcourt, 1.905 million Benin City (2023)

=== Niue ===
1,000 ALOFI (capital) (2018)

=== North Macedonia ===
606,000 SKOPJE (capital) (2022)

=== Northern Mariana Islands ===
51,000 SAIPAN (capital) (2018)

=== Norway ===
1.071 million OSLO (capital) (2022)

=== Oman ===
1.623 million MUSCAT (capital) (2022)

=== Pakistan ===
17.236 million Karachi, 13.979 million Lahore, 3.711 million Faisalabad, 2.415 million Gujranwala, 2.412 million Peshawar, 1.232 million ISLAMABAD (capital) (2023)

=== Palau ===
277 NGERULMUD (capital) (2018)

=== Palestine ===
756,000 Gaza; 153,237 RAMALLAH (Capital) (2022)

=== Panama ===
1.977 million PANAMA CITY (capital) (2023)

=== Papua New Guinea ===
410,000 PORT MORESBY (capital) (2023)

=== Paraguay ===
3.511 million ASUNCION (capital) (2023)

=== Peru ===
11.204 million LIMA (capital), 959,000 Arequipa, 904,000 Trujillo (2023)

=== Philippines ===
14.667 million MANILA (capital), 1.949 million Davao, 1.025 million Cebu City, 931,000 Zamboanga, 960,000 Antipolo, 803,000 Cagayan de Oro City, 803,000 Dasmarinas (2023)

=== Poland ===
1.798 million WARSAW (capital), 769,000 Krakow (2023)

=== Portugal ===
3.001 million LISBON (capital), 1.325 million Porto (2023)

=== Puerto Rico ===
2.440 million SAN JUAN (capital) (2023)

=== Qatar ===
779,000 Ar-Rayyan; 652,000 DOHA (capital) (2022)

=== Romania ===
1.785 million BUCHAREST (capital) (2022)

=== Russia ===
12.680 million MOSCOW (capital), 5.561 million Saint Petersburg, 1.695 million Novosibirsk, 1.528 million Yekaterinburg, 1.292 million Kazan, 1.251 million Nizhniy Novgorod (2023)

=== Rwanda ===
1.208 million KIGALI (capital) (2022)

=== Saint Helena, Ascension, and Tristan da Cunha ===
1,000 JAMESTOWN (capital) (2018)

=== Saint Kitts and Nevis ===
14,000 BASSETERRE (capital) (2018)

=== Saint Lucia ===
22,000 CASTRIES (capital) (2018)

=== Saint Pierre and Miquelon ===
6,000 SAINT – PIERRE (capital) (2018)

=== Saint Vincent and the Grenadines ===
27,000 KINGSTOWN (capital) (2018)

=== Samoa ===
36,000 APIA (capital) (2018)

=== San Marino ===
4,000 SAN MARINO (2018)

=== São Tomé and Príncipe ===
80,000 SÃO TOMÉ (capital) (2018)

=== Saudi Arabia ===
7.682 million RIYADH (capital), 4.863 million Jeddah, 2.150 million Mecca, 1.573 million Medina, 1.329 million Ad Dammam, 872,000 million Hufuf-Mubarraz (2023)

=== Senegal ===
3.326 million DAKAR (capital) (2022)

=== Serbia ===
1.405 million BELGRADE (capital) (2022)

=== Seychelles ===
28,000 VICTORIA (capital) (2018)

=== Sierra Leone ===
1.272 million FREETOWN (capital) (2022)

=== Singapore ===
6.081 million SINGAPORE (capital) (2023)

=== Sint Maarten ===
1,327 PHILIPSBURG (capital) (2011)

=== Slovakia ===
439,000 BRATISLAVA (capital) (2022)

=== Slovenia ===
286,000 LJUBLJANA (capital) (2018)

=== Solomon Islands ===
82,000 HONIARA (capital) (2018)

=== Somalia ===
2.610 million MOGADISHU (capital), 1.127 million Hargeysa (2023)

=== South Africa ===
10.316 million Johannesburg (includes Ekurhuleni), 4.890 million Cape Town (legislative capital), 3.228 million Durban, 2.818 million PRETORIA (administrative capital), 1.296 million Port Elizabeth, 934,000 West Rand (2023)

=== South Sudan ===
459,000 JUBA (capital) (2023)

=== Spain ===
6.751 million MADRID (capital), 5.687 million Barcelona, 838,000 Valencia (2023)

=== Sri Lanka ===
103,000 Sri Jayewardenepura Kotte (legislative capital) (2018), 633,000 COLOMBO (capital) (2023)

=== Sudan ===
6.344 million KHARTOUM (capital), 1.057 million Nyala (2023)

=== Suriname ===
239,000 PARAMARIBO (capital) (2018)

=== Sweden ===
1.659 million STOCKHOLM (capital) (2022)

=== Switzerland ===
1.420 million Zurich, 437,000 BERN (capital) (2022)

=== Syria ===
2.585 million DAMASCUS (capital), 2.203 million Aleppo, 1.443 million Hims (Homs), 996,000 Hamah (2023)

=== Taiwan ===
4.504 million New Taipei City, 2.754 million TAIPEI (capital), 2.319 million Taoyuan, 1.553 million Kaohsiung, 1.369 million Taichung, 863,000 Tainan (2023)

=== Tajikistan ===
962,000 DUSHANBE (capital) (2022)

=== Tanzania ===
262,000 Dodoma (legislative capital) (2018), 7.776 million DAR ES SALAAM (administrative capital), 1.311 million Mwanza, 800,000 Zanzibar (2023)

=== Thailand ===
10.5 million BANGKOK (capital), 1.2 million Chiang Mai, 450,000 Nakhon Ratchasima, 415,000 Khon Kaen,

400,000 Hat Yai (2023)

=== Timor-Leste ===
281,000 DILI (capital) (2018)

=== Togo ===
1.926 million LOME (capital) (2022)

=== Tonga ===
23,000 NUKU'ALOFA (2018)

=== Trinidad and Tobago ===
545,000 PORT OF SPAIN (capital) (2022)

=== Tunisia ===
2.439 million TUNIS (capital) (2022)

=== Turkey ===
15.848 million Istanbul, 5.397 million ANKARA (capital), 3.088 million Izmir, 2.086 million Bursa, 1.836 million Adana, 1.805 million Gaziantep (2023)

=== Turkmenistan ===
883,000 ASHGABAT (capital) (2022)

=== Turks and Caicos Islands ===
5,000 GRAND TURK (capital) (2018)

=== Tuvalu ===
7,000 FUNAFUTI (capital) (2018)

=== Uganda ===
3.652 million KAMPALA (capital) (2022)

=== Ukraine ===
3.010 million KYIV (capital); 1.423 million Kharkiv; 1.008 million Odesa; 952,000 Dnipro; 893,000 Donetsk (2022)

=== United Arab Emirates ===
2.964 million Dubai; 1.786 million Sharjah; 1.540 million ABU DHABI (capital) (2022)

=== United Kingdom ===
9.648 million LONDON (capital), 2.791 million Manchester, 2.665 million Birmingham, 1.929 million West Yorkshire, 1.698 million Glasgow, 952,000 Southampton / Portsmouth (2023)

=== United States ===
18.937 million New York – Newark, 12.534 million Los Angeles – Long Beach – Santa Ana, 8.937 million Chicago, 6.707 million Houston, 6.574 million Dallas – Fort Worth, 5.490 million WASHINGTON, D.C. (capital) (2023)

=== Uruguay ===
1.767 million MONTEVIDEO (capital) (2022)

=== Uzbekistan ===
2.574 million TASHKENT (capital) (2022)

=== Vanuatu ===
53,000 PORT – VILA (capital) (2018)

=== Venezuela ===
2.972 million CARACAS (capital), 2.368 million Maracaibo, 1.983 million Valencia, 1.254 million Barquisimeto, 1.243 million Maracay, 964,000 Ciudad Guayana (2023)

=== Vietnam ===
9.321 million Ho Chi Minh City, 5.253 million HANOI (capital), 1.865 million Can Tho, 1.423 million Hai Phong, 1.221 million Da Nang, 1.111 million Bien Hoa (2023)

=== Virgin Islands ===
52,000 CHARLOTTE AMALIE (capital) (2018)

=== Wallis and Futuna ===
1,000 MATA – UTU (capital) (2018)

=== Yemen ===
3.182 million SANAA (capital), 1.045 million Aden (2022)

=== Zambia ===
3.042 million LUSAKA (capital) (2022)

=== Zimbabwe ===
1.558 million HARARE (capital) (2022)
